Certified Naturally Grown (CNG), "The Grassroots Alternative to Certified Organic", is a US-based farm assurance program certifying  produce, livestock and apiaries for organic producers who sell locally and directly to their customers. CNG was founded in 2002 by organic farmers Kate and Ron Khosla, as a simpler to administer and less expensive alternative to the USDA's National Organic Program (NOP) certification, using a production standard based on the NOP. It is operated as a non-profit corporation, headquartered in Brooklyn, New York.

History

According to Ron Khosla, CNG was created as reaction to the legislating of organic production in the US in 2002:

"Farmers that have proudly referred to themselves as “Organic” for decades were not permitted to do so after October 21, 2002, unless certified by a USDA-sanctioned agency. Today, most family farmers that continue to grow organic are not certified by the USDA. It shouldn’t matter…except that the law states a farmer cannot declare or even describe their produce as “organic” (including “non-certified organic”) unless it is certified by a USDA accredited certifier."

Certification process

Certified Naturally Grown farmers are required to submit to an annual inspection. and pay an annual fee. In contrast with the NOP, where inspections are conducted by a USDA-accredited certifying agency and third-party inspectors, CNG farms may be inspected by other CNG farmers, non-CNG farmers, extension agents, master gardeners and customers, with CNG farmers being ideal. Inspection procedures and forms can be perused and downloaded, and completed applications and signed declarations are available for public viewing, on the CNG web site. All CNG farms are subject to random pesticide residue testing.

International scope

CNG operates in the US and Canada. A United Kingdom sister organization, the Wholesome Food Association, promotes similar food production standards at the local, grassroots level, but does not operate a certification program.

References

External links
Certified Naturally Grown
Wholesome Food Association – CNG's sister group in the UK

Organic food certification organizations